Fletcher Jenkins (born November 4, 1959 in Tacoma, Washington) is a former professional American football defensive lineman for one season with the Baltimore Colts in the National Football League.  He played college football at the University of Washington where he was a team captain.

References

 
 
 

1959 births
Living people
Players of American football from Tacoma, Washington
American football defensive tackles
Washington Huskies football players
Baltimore Colts players